Henry Hoare I (1677–1725), known as Good Henry, was an English banker and landowner.

Career
Born the son of Sir Richard Hoare, founder of C. Hoare & Co bankers, Henry the Good became a Partner in the bank in August 1702. Together with his father, he became a commissioner for the building of 50 new churches in London in 1711. Following his father's death in 1719, he managed the bank through the South Sea Bubble of 1720, making a profit of over £28,000 from the crisis. He acquired the Stourhead estate in 1717 but died before the new house there had been fully completed.

In 1702 he married Jane Benson; they had three children:
Jane (d.1762)
Henry Hoare II (1705–1785)
Sir Richard Hoare (1709–1754), Lord Mayor of London 1745–46

References

Further reading
Dodd, Dudley, Stourhead, published by The National Trust, 1981
Hoare, Henry Peregrine Rennie, Hoare's Bank: A Record 1672–1955, 1932, new edition 1955
Hutchings, Victoria, Messrs Hoare, Bankers: A History of the Hoare Banking Dynasty, 2005

1677 births
1725 deaths
English bankers
17th-century English businesspeople
18th-century English people
Hoare family